Fidock is a surname. Notable people with the surname include:
Harold Fidock (1902–1986), Australian cricketer
David A. Fidock (born 1965), Australian microbiologist and immunologist